The Gurdwara Gyan Godri Sahib, also known as Gurdwara Sri Gyan Godri Sahib, meaning "treasure of knowledge" was one of the holiest Gurdwara at Har Ki Pauri, Haridwar in the state of Uttarakhand, India. It existed at the place where The Bharat Scouts and Guides office exists today at the market in Subhash Ghat of Har Ki Pauri which is verified by Municipal Corporation Haridwar records of 1935.

Significance
In 1504–1505, the first Guru of Sikhs Guru Nanak Dev visited Haridwar during his first Missionary travel (Udasi). He saw Brahmins (priests) in river Ganga offering water to rising Sun God towards east intended to reach the spirits of their deceased ancestors. He started throwing water in opposite direction which made Brahmins curious and surprised. When questioned, Guru Nanak replied he is watering his crops in fields at Kartarpur. If water can reach can reach sun it sure can reach his far away fields in Kartarpur. Guru Nanak taught them lesson of living superstition free life.

History and Destruction of Gurudwara 
A small building of Gurudwara Gyan Godri Sahib existed till 1975 at Landhaura House area in Har Ki Pauri of Haridwar where a tenant, Ram Piari, used to pray before a copy of the Guru Granth Sahib. After Kumbh Mela stampede of 1966, Haridwar administration acquired Landhora House to widen Har Ki Pauri in 1979 and demolished the Gurudwara. Sikhs were not allowed to reconstruct Gurudwara again. Also, An ancient Gurudwara Nanakwara was located 200 metres from the said spot. Currently the office The Bharat Scouts and Guides where Gurudwara Gyan Godri once existed.

Efforts for reconstruction
Shiromani Gurdwara Parbandhak Committee and DSGMC unsuccessfully tried to get back the land and reconstruct it. Gurcharan Singh Babbar's All India Sikh Conference (AISC) is also working to rebuild Gurudwara again which was demolished in 1979. Professor Pandit Rao Dharennavar recited Japji Sahib on Guru Nanak Gurpurab at Har Ki Pauri for the cause.

See also

 Gurdwara Lal Khoohi
 List of Gurudwaras
 Gurdwara Darbar Sahib Kartarpur
 Gurudwara Sis Ganj Sahib
 Hazur Sahib Nanded
 Takht Sri Patna Sahib

References

External links
 Official Website

Religious buildings and structures completed in 1504
Religious buildings and structures with domes
Religious tourism in India
Tourist attractions in Uttarakhand
Demolished buildings and structures in India
Buildings and structures demolished in 1979